Once More  may refer to:

 Once More (Porter Wagoner and Dolly Parton album), 1970
 Once More (Billy Higgins album), 1980
 Once More (Spandau Ballet album), 2009
 Once More (Colonial Cousins album), 2012 
 Once More (1988 film), a 1988 French drama film
 Once More (1997 film), a 1997 Indian Tamil film starring Vijay and Sivaji Ganesan
 Once More (2012 film), a 2012 Film
 "Once More" (song), a 2001 single by The Orb 
 Once More, a 1958 song by Roy Acuff
Once More (video game), 2021
Once More, another name for  Friedrich Nietzsche's Zarathustra's roundelay